The discography of American record producer, sound engineer, and rapper Dr. Dre consists of three studio albums, forty-two singles, (including twenty-four as a featured artist), two compilation album, one soundtrack album, and twenty-one music videos.

Dr. Dre began his rap career in the World Class Wreckin' Cru in the mid-1980s and performed with the group N.W.A from 1987 to 1991. In 1992, Dr. Dre launched his solo career with the collaborative single with Snoop Dogg "Deep Cover" and the album The Chronic under Death Row Records. The Chronic was certified triple platinum in the United States. Its singles "Nuthin' but a 'G' Thang" and "Fuck wit Dre Day (And Everybody's Celebratin')" both made the top ten spots of the American Billboard Hot 100 chart; "Let Me Ride" reached number three on the Hot Rap Tracks chart. Dr. Dre also began his career as a record producer, with his first productions including Snoop Dogg's 1993 debut album Doggystyle and the soundtrack to the film Above the Rim. He performed in guest spots for other artists in Ice Cube's "Natural Born Killaz" and 2Pac's "California Love". Dr. Dre's 1995 single "Keep Their Heads Ringin'" was another top ten hit and was featured in the soundtrack to the film Friday. In 1996, Dr. Dre left Death Row to form his own record label Aftermath Entertainment and released a compilation Dr. Dre Presents the Aftermath with his single "Been There, Done That" and other tracks from artists newly signed to Aftermath.

In 1999, Dr. Dre released his second studio album 2001. This album went six times platinum in the US and five times platinum in Canada (500,000 units). Singles "Forgot About Dre" and "The Next Episode" reached the top ten spots of the Hot Rap Tracks chart. As the founder and CEO of Aftermath Entertainment, Dr. Dre focused on producing for other artists during the 2000s and appeared on singles by Eminem, including "Encore" in 2004 and "Crack a Bottle" in 2009. Dr. Dre began recording his cancelled album Detox in 2003, and intended it to be his final album.

In 2014, Aftermath producer Dawaun Parker revealed that Dr. Dre was working on a new album, but that it would not be titled Detox and he had scrapped that title "a couple [of] years ago". The album's title was eventually announced as Compton, and acts as the soundtrack to the N.W.A biographical film Straight Outta Compton. The album debuted at number two on the Billboard Top 200, and number one in the United Kingdom, Canada, Australia, Ireland, New Zealand, Belgium, France, the Netherlands and Switzerland.

Albums

Studio albums

EPs

Compilation albums

Soundtrack albums

Singles

As lead artist

As featured artist

Other charted songs

Guest appearances

Music videos

Notes

References 

Hip hop discographies
Dr. Dre
Discographies of American artists